Mercedes Alvarez may refer to:

 Mercedes Álvarez, Cuban athlete
 Mercedes Álvarez (director)
 Mercedes Alvarez (volleyball) (born 1996), Cuban volleyball player
 Mercedes Alvarez (politician), Filipino politician